was a railway station located in Suzu, Ishikawa Prefecture, Japan.

Line
 Noto Railway
 Noto Line

History
This station was opened on September 21, 1964, by Japanese National Railways as the terminus of the Noto Line. After the privatization of JNR on April 1, 1987, the station as well as the line was operated by West Japan Railway Company, which transferred the line and the station to Noto Railway on March 25, 1988.

Noto Railway abandoned the Noto Line and closed the station on April 1, 2005.

Layout
The station had only one platform serving one track. (See picture)

Adjacent stations

References

External links 
 Takojima Station page at notor.info

Railway stations in Ishikawa Prefecture
Defunct railway stations in Japan
Stations of West Japan Railway Company
Railway stations in Japan opened in 1964
Railway stations closed in 2005